William Neast (c. 1623 – c. 1670) was an English politician who sat in the House of Commons  in 1653 and in 1656.  

Neast was the son of William Neast of the Neast family of Chaceley, Worcestershire. He matriculated at Magdalen College, Oxford, on 27 August 1638 aged 15 and entered Middle Temple in 1640. He received a commission as captain of horse on 8 February 1651 

In 1653, Neast was elected Member of Parliament for Gloucestershire in Barebone's Parliament. He was re-elected MP for Gloucestershire in 1656 for the Second Protectorate Parliament. In 1662 he was removed from the Common Council of Tewkesbury.
 
Neast married Elizabeth Atwood of Old Sodbury.

References

 

1623 births
1670 deaths
Year of birth uncertain
Year of death uncertain
Alumni of Magdalen College, Oxford
Members of the Middle Temple
People from Gloucestershire
English MPs 1653 (Barebones)
English MPs 1656–1658